The Table Tennis Federation of India (TTFI) is the governing body for table tennis in India. The TTFI was established in 1926, and was a founding member of the International Table Tennis Federation (ITTF). TTFI's membership includes 32 state units and 37 institutions.

Dushyant Chautala was elected as President of the TTFI at the federation's annual general body meeting on 30 January 2017, becoming the youngest President in the TTFI's history.

References

Sports governing bodies in India
Table tennis in India
1926 establishments in India
Sports organizations established in 1926
Organisations based in Delhi

https://theprint.in/sport/ttfi-election-meghna-ahlawat-to-be-first-women-president-tt-legend-kamlesh-mehta-to-take-over-as-secretary-general/1249956/